WGLR (1280 AM) was a radio station that went off the air as of April 1, 2015. WGLR previously broadcast a sports format. Prior to sports, the station had an oldies format, simulcasting sister station WPVL 1590 kHz in Platteville, Wisconsin. Before oldies, WGLR(AM) had a country music format simulcasting co-owned WGLR-FM. Licensed to Lancaster, Wisconsin, United States.  WGLR (AM) began as a daytime only station and later added nighttime service with lower power. The station's ownership requested its license be cancelled by the FCC on April 1, 2016.

References

External links
FCC Station Search Details: DWGLR (Facility ID: 33053)
FCC History Cards for WGLR (covering 1975-1979)

Morgan Murphy Media stations
GLR
Defunct radio stations in the United States
2016 disestablishments in Wisconsin
Radio stations disestablished in 2016
GLR